Thecocarcelia is a genus of flies in the family Tachinidae.

Species
T. acutangulata (Macquart, 1850)
T. hainanensis Chao, 1976
T. linearifrons (van der Wulp, 1893)
T. melanohalterata Chao & Jin, 1984
T. nigrapex Shima, 1998
T. ochracea Shima, 1998
T. oculata (Baranov, 1935)
T. parnarae Chao, 1976
T. sumatrana (Baranov, 1932)
T. trichops Herting, 1967

References

Diptera of Europe
Diptera of Asia
Exoristinae
Tachinidae genera
Taxa named by Charles Henry Tyler Townsend